Rohit Tokas is an Indian boxer who competes in Welterweight category. He participated in the 2022 Commonwealth Games where he won a bronze medal in Men's welterweight category. Rohit hails from an urban village in Delhi by the name Munirka which lies in the South West District of Delhi. Rohit's father Preet Singh Tokas, was himself a wrestler.

Coaching career 
Tokas have founded Tokas boxing club . MMA fighter Anshul Jubli learnt boxing under him in this club. Later Jubli won the reality show Road to UFC and got signed to Ultimate Fighting Championship, which is worlds' leading MMA promotion.

References

Living people
Indian male boxers
Boxers at the 2022 Commonwealth Games
Welterweight boxers
1993 births
Commonwealth Games bronze medallists for India
Commonwealth Games medallists in boxing
Medallists at the 2022 Commonwealth Games